Abul Barkat (born September 27, 1954) is a Bangladeshi economist and a professor in the Department of Economics, University of Dhaka. In addition to his teaching, from 2009 to 2014 he was the former chairman of Janata Bank Ltd. He is the present elected president of the Bangladesh Economic Association. He is a freedom fighter.

Early life and education
Barkat was born on September 27, 1954, in Kushtia District to his parents Abul Quasem and Mst Nurun Nahar. Barkat is the third child of his parents. His wife is Shahida Akhter. They have three daughters. Barkat passed SSC exam from Kushtia Zilla School in 1970 and HSC from Kushtia Govt. College in 1973, both with first division with distinction. Barkat graduated from Moscow Institute of National Economy, now Plekhanov Russian University of Economics in 1978 obtaining highest grades in all courses with honors first class and then completed a PhD from the same institute, in development economics.

Career
In 1982 Barkat started his professional career by joining the Department of Economics, Dhaka University. He is the immediate past chairman of the same department. He was the Chairman of Janata Bank Limited from 2009 to 2014. He is the Chief Adviser of most reputed private sector research organization. Barkat was elected president of the Bangladesh Economic Association at the end of 2017.

Publication
Barkat already published 600 research publications. He is credited with 24 research book, 119 journal articles with chapters in research books, 221 research monograph, 232 Research paper present national & International conference. In addition, he has delivered at least 10 public lectures and memorial lectures on national and international issues. Some of the notable publications (research based book) of Barkat are:
 Development as Concientization (Published in English & Bengali language 2008, 2010)
 Deprivation of Hindu Minority in Bangladesh: Living with Vested Property (Published English and Bengali languages 2008, 2009)
 Land Litigation in Bangladesh: A Case of Colossal National Wastage (Published English & Bengali language 2008, 2009)
 Charland in Bangladesh: Political Economy of Ignored Resources (2007)
 Political Economy of Khas Land in Bangladesh (Published English & Bengali language 2001, 2009)
 Economics of Fundamentalism in Bangladesh  (2005, 2008, 2012, 2013)
 An Inquiry into Causes and Consequences of Deprivation of Hindu Minorities in Bangladesh through the Vested Property Act: Framework for a Realistic Solution (2000)
 Life and Land of Adibashis: Land Dispossession and Alienation of Adibashis in the Plain Districts of Bangladesh (2009)
 Social Protection Measures in Bangladesh: As Means to Improve Child Well-being (2011)
 Political Economy of Madrassa Education in Bangladesh: Genesis, Growth, and Impact (2011)
 Poverty disparity inequality in Bangladesh: In Search of a Unified Political Economic Theory (2014)

Social commitments and responsibilities
 Founder Chairman, .Present Director of Japan study Center University Of Dhaka. It is one of the most leading learning center in Dhaka University. A lot of brilliant students learn here. Founder Chairman, Abul Barkat Peace and Progress Foundation (ABPPF).
 President, Manob Sakti Unnayan Kendra (MSUK, Kushtia: Working with Arsenic Filter).
 Involvement with Different Non-Government Organizations: (Executive/General Committee) ALRD (Dhaka), ADAMS (Khulna), Nijera Kori (Dhaka), Shabolombi (Netrokona), SAMATA (Dhaka); Founder President, Leonard Cheshire Disability (LCD), Bangladesh;  Honorary Trustee, Lichtbrücke e.V. Germany in Bangladesh  (The Bridge of Light, Germany in Bangladesh); Chief Advisor, Human Development Research Centre (HDRC); Chairman, Medical Education and Health Development Association (MEDHA), Kushtia.

Awards
 Justice Ibrahim Memorial Gold Medal awarded, (1996-2000) & (2004-2005) Dhaka University
 Mercantile Bank Gold Award (2008)

References

1954 births
Living people
University of Dhaka alumni
Academic staff of the University of Dhaka
20th-century Bangladeshi economists
Plekhanov Russian University of Economics alumni
People from Kushtia District
20th-century Bangladeshi writers
20th-century Bangladeshi male writers
21st-century Bangladeshi economists
21st-century male writers
Kushtia Government College Alumni